Akilah! is the third album by soul jazz guitarist Melvin Sparks recorded for the Prestige label in 1972.

Reception

Allmusic awarded the album 3 stars.

Track listing
All compositions by Melvin Sparks except where noted.
 "Love the Life You Live" (Gene Redd, Kool & the Gang) – 5:39
 "On the Up" – 6:00
 "All Wrapped Up" – 4:45
 "Akilah" – 4:42
 "Blues for J.B." – 7:09
 "The Image of Love" (Leon Spencer) – 6:49

Personnel
 Melvin Sparks – guitar
 Virgil Jones (tracks 1, 2 & 4), Ernie Royal (track 4) – trumpet
 Sonny Fortune (tracks 1, 2, 4 & 5), George Coleman (track 4) – alto saxophone
 Frank Wess – tenor saxophone (tracks 1, 2 & 4)
 Dave Hubbard – tenor saxophone (track 6), flute (tracks 3)
 Hubert Laws – flute (track 3)
 Leon Spencer – organ, piano
 Idris Muhammad – drums
 Buddy Caldwell – congas
 Billy Ver Planck – arranger (tracks 1 & 2)

Production
 Ozzie Cadena – producer
 Rudy Van Gelder – engineer

References

Melvin Sparks albums
1972 albums
Prestige Records albums
Albums produced by Ozzie Cadena
Albums recorded at Van Gelder Studio